Waltzer is a surname. It may refer to:

Jack Waltzer ( since 1967), American acting coach and actor
Kenneth Waltzer (born 1942), American Holocaust historian, author, and educator

See also
Walser (surname)
Walzer (surname)
Wälzer (surname)

German-language surnames